Pierre Chammassian (born in Bourj Hammoud on 9 March 1949, Beirut, Lebanon) is a Lebanese-Armenian comedian, actor and stand-up comic, popular in Lebanon with Arabs and Armenians, as well as in the Armenian Diaspora. 
a

Career
Chammassian regularly tours wherever Armenian and Lebanese communities exist. Along with André Jadaa, Michel and Jean-Pierre Chikhani, Chammassian was responsible for reviving the Le Théâtre de Dix-Heures in Lebanon. He is a follower of the Armenian Catholic Church, and is an Armenian Revolutionary Federation supporter.

Chammassian has had many roles over the course of his career, but is best known for his character Batal Shvaradzian, who has featured in six plays to date: Shad Mi Kharner, Batal Dan Pesa, Portzank Batal, Chellalik Batal, Hamartsag Hasmige ou Batale and Yerespokhan Batale. Other plays of his include Harses Prnetzi and Lezoon Voskor Chooni.

See also 

 Théâtre de Dix-Heures
 Sami Khayat
 Mario Bassil

References
 

Lebanese comedians
Lebanese people of Armenian descent
Lebanese Eastern Catholics
Armenian Catholics
People from Beirut
Living people
1949 births